Jurislav "Jura" Stublić (born 19 December 1953) is a Croatian singer-songwriter.

References

1950s births
Singers from Sarajevo
Living people
Croatian rock musicians
20th-century Croatian male singers
Bosnia and Herzegovina rock singers
Yugoslav male singers
Croatian singer-songwriters